Meloidogynidae is a family of nematodes belonging to the order Rhabditida.

Genera:
 Meloidoderella Khan, 1972
 Meloidogyne Goeldi, 1892
 Spartonema Siddiqi, 1986

References

Nematodes